Tomáš Pospíšil may refer to:

Tomáš Pospíšil (footballer) (born 1991), Czech professional association football player
Tomáš Pospíšil (ice hockey) (born 1987), Czech professional ice hockey player